A Deep Space Network is a communication network that supports interplanetary spacecraft missions; several instances exist, such as:
 NASA Deep Space Network, a worldwide network of large antennas and communication facilities, located in the United States (California), Spain (Madrid), and Australia (Canberra), that supports interplanetary spacecraft missions
 Chinese Deep Space Network, a network of large antennas and communication facilities that supports the lunar and interplanetary spacecraft missions of China
 European Deep Space Network
 Japanese Deep Space Network
 Indian Deep Space Network, an Indian network of large antennas and communication facilities that supports the interplanetary spacecraft missions of India
 Russian Deep Space Network, a Russian managed network of large antennas and communication facilities that supports interplanetary spacecraft missions, and radio and radar astronomy observations for the exploration of the solar system and the universe